Gâteaux may refer to:
 plural of gâteau, meaning cake
 René Gateaux (1889–1914), a French mathematician
Gateaux derivative, mathematical concept